Gerdeh Rural District is in the Central District of Namin County, Ardabil province, Iran. At the census of 2006, its population was 2,731 in 715 households; there were 2,755 inhabitants in 886 households at the following census of 2011; and in the most recent census of 2016, the population of the rural district was 1,890 in 632 households. The largest of its 28 villages was Novashnaq, with 293 people.

References 

Namin County

Rural Districts of Ardabil Province

Populated places in Ardabil Province

Populated places in Namin County